Header may refer to:

Computers and engineering
 Header (computing), supplemental data at the beginning of a data block
 E-mail header
 HTTP header
 Header file, a text file used in computer programming (especially in C and C++)
 A pin header is a mainly male style of electrical connector on printed circuit boards, including motherboards, providing links to external devices
 Exhaust manifold, in automotive design

Construction
 Lintels (headers), structural members in light-frame construction which run perpendicular to floor and ceiling joists, "heading" them off to create an opening
 Lintel (architecture), a structural member in post-and-lintel building construction
 In brickwork,  a brick laid with its short side exposed
 In piping, a manifold or length of pipe that connects multiple smaller pipes

Sports
 Header (sailing): a term used in sailboat racing to denote a wind shift
 Header, a herding dog with a specific method of interacting with its flock
 Header, a headlong fall, particularly from a penny-farthing bicycle
 Header (association football), use of the player's head to direct the ball in association football (soccer)
 Header, a competitor in the team roping rodeo event who specializes in roping a steer's head

Other
Header (film), a 2006 film
Header (band), an Australian power pop band
Page header, in printing or typography the material separated from the main body that appears at the top of a page
Combine header or head, part of a combine harvester
Stripper (agriculture), type of grain harvester
 Header, is a reference to an area within a document that serves to provide the needed context on the content that is included in the report. Headers are often used in reporting to segment content in a consistent manner from one report to another.  In this context, especially recognizing the evolving technology display user interfaces, the Header information may appear anywhere within that display (aka Quip :).

See also
 Head (disambiguation)
 Headed (disambiguation)
 Heading (disambiguation)
 Footer (disambiguation)